Qaranjik may refer to:
Qaranjik-e Gukcheli
Qaranjik-e Khavjeh Khan
Qaranjik-e Pur Aman